The Sheffield Baronetcy, of Normanby in the County of Lincoln, is a title in the Baronetage of Great Britain. It was created on 1 March 1755 for Charles Herbert Sheffield, the illegitimate son of John Sheffield, 1st Duke of Buckingham and Normanby.
On the death of his half brother, the 2nd Duke, in 1735, he inherited the family estates including Buckingham House which was sold to George III in 1762 and Normanby Hall which latter remained the family residence until 1963. Thereafter the family's home was Sutton Park, York.

The fourth baronet served as High Sheriff of Lincolnshire in 1817 and the fifth baronet in 1872. The sixth baronet sat as Conservative member of parliament for Brigg.

Samantha Cameron is the daughter of the eighth Baronet and Cara Delevingne is the great-great-granddaughter of the sixth baronet.

Sheffield baronets, of Normanby (1755—)

  Sir Charles Herbert Sheffield, 1st Baronet (–1774), who was born Charles Herbert and who took the name Sheffield in 1735 on the death of his half-brother Edmund Sheffield.
  Sir John Sheffield, 2nd Baronet (c. 1743–1815)
  Sir Robert Sheffield, 3rd Baronet (c. 1758–1815)
  Sir Robert Sheffield, 4th Baronet (1786–1862)
  Sir Robert Sheffield, 5th Baronet (1823–1886)
  Sir Berkeley Digby George Sheffield, 6th Baronet (1876–1946)
  Sir Robert Arthur Sheffield, 7th Baronet (1905–1977)
 Edmund Charles Reginald Sheffield (1908—1977)
  Sir Reginald Adrian Berkeley Sheffield, 8th Baronet (1946—)
  Samantha Gwendoline Sheffield (1971–)
  Emily Julia Sheffield (1973–)
 Alice Daisy Victoria Sheffield (1980–)
 Lucy Mary Sheffield (1981–)
 (1) Robert Charles Berkeley Sheffield (1984—)
 George Berkeley Sheffield (1910—1968)
 John Vincent Sheffield (1913—2008)
 (2) John Julian Lionel George Sheffield (1938—)
 (3) John David Sheffield (1963—)
 (4) Simon Robert Alexander Sheffield (1964—)
 (5) Lionel Julian Sheffield (1969—)
 (6) Jake Sheffield (1999—)
 (7) Oliver Sheffield (2002—)

The heir apparent is the present holder's son, Robert Charles Berkeley Sheffield (born 1984).

The heir apparent's heir presumptive is the present holder's first cousin, John Julian Lionel George Sheffield (born 1938).

Arms
First five baronets bore argent, a chevron between three garbs gules, all within a bordure gobony argent and azure.
Since 6th baronet they bore argent, a chevron engrailed between two garbs in chief gules, and in base a sheaf of arrows proper, banded also gules.

See also
Duke of Buckingham and Normanby
Robert Sheffield

Notes

References

Further reading
Burke's Peerage

External links
Deed Poll Office: Private Act of Parliament 1735 (9 Geo. 2). c. 20
House of Sheffield and Phipps

Sheffield
1755 establishments in Great Britain
Sheffield family